Aphyosemion splendopleure is a species of freshwater fish belonging to the family Aplocheilidae. It is found in brooks and streams in Cameroon, Equatorial Guinea and Gabon.

References

Freshwater fish of Africa
Fish of Cameroon
Fish described in 1929
splendopleure